The Negro Scipion is an early painting by Paul Cézanne. The work may be a fragment of a larger composition, or it may be a preparatory study for another work. Scipion was reportedly a frequent model at the Académie Suisse, which Cézanne attended after his arrival in Paris. Émile Zola gave the painting to Claude Monet, and it remained in the possession of the Monet family until 1950. The French art critic Louis Vauxcelles described it as a "striking masterpiece" and called it "worthy of Delacroix."

See also
List of paintings by Paul Cézanne

References

External links

1867 paintings
Artists' models
Paul Cézanne